Kırıkkale MKE Weapon Industry Museum is a museum in Kırıkkale, Turkey. Mechanical and Chemical Industry Corporation (MKE) of Turkey has a weapons factory in Kırıkkale. The museum was established by MKE on 15 July 1990. On 2 November 1993 it was transferred to its current location.

The collection of the museum, as the name implies, is composed of historical (14th-20th centuries) weapons. These weapons are collected from all over Turkey. They are either Turkish or European made. Presently there are 299 weapons in the museum.

References

Buildings and structures in Kırklareli Province
1993 establishments in Turkey
Museums in Turkey
Military and war museums in Turkey
Tourist attractions in Kırıkkale Province
Museums established in 1993